Marco Ehmann (born 3 August 2000) is a Romanian footballer who plays as a defender for Cypriot First Division club Enosis Neon Paralimni.

He made his debut in Liga I for Dinamo București in a match against FC Voluntari, on 2 August 2020.

Career statistics

Club

References

External links 
 
 #6 Marco Ehmann at fcdinamo.ro

2000 births
Living people
People from Tuttlingen (district)
Footballers from Baden-Württemberg
German people of Romanian descent
Romanian footballers
Association football defenders
Romania youth international footballers
Germany youth international footballers
Liga I players
Liga II players
Cypriot First Division players
FC Dinamo București players
FCV Farul Constanța players
CSM Reșița players
Enosis Neon Paralimni FC players
Romanian expatriate footballers
Expatriate footballers in Cyprus